Newport International Sports Village is a multi-sport complex located at Lliswerry in the South East of the city of Newport, South Wales. It is known locally as Spytty Park, the name coming from the original Spytty Fields on which it is built.

The complex includes a football development centre, athletics/football stadium, velodrome and attached cycle speedway track, tennis centre, swimming pool and cricket pitches. The Tennis Centre is a multi sport facility.

The Velodrome was used by the Great Britain track cycling team as their exclusive base for their final preparations for the 2012 Summer Olympics. It had previously been used by the team for the 2004 and 2008 Summer Olympics.

Facilities

Wales National Velodrome

Dragon Park, Wales National Football Development Centre

Newport Stadium 

Newport Stadium is the primary athletics venue in Newport. It is also a Conference National standard football stadium, being the former home ground of Newport County A.F.C. The stadium is used by Llanwern A.F.C. and Newport Harriers Athletic Club. It is owned and managed by Newport City Council.

South East Wales Regional Swimming Pool 
The pool was built to replace the art deco Maindee baths as Newport's senior competition pool. The pool is a 25-metre, 8-lane competition pool with a movable floor. There is also a training pool (20m x 7m) that backs onto the main pool and over 500 seats for spectators in the main pool.

Newport Tennis Centre 
The Tennis Centre is one of the original buildings in the complex. When the pool was built, it was built onto the existing centre. The Tennis Centre is a multi sport facility for tennis (indoor and outdoor), 5–a-side football, basketball, hockey, netball, table tennis, badminton and squash. It also has cricket nets in one hall.

Cricket pitches 
The village has two cricket pitches and has been the home of Newport Cricket Club since 1990. A pavilion separates the two pitches with a small seating area in the pavilion looking onto one pitch. Cricket nets were installed behind the astroturf in 2003-04 for the summer months. There are also Cricket nets in the Tennis Centre for the winter.

The ground was the venue for Glamorgan County Cricket Club's home County Championship match against Gloucestershire in May 2019, the first time that Newport had hosted a match in the competition since 1965 and the first county match at the current ground. County cricket was previously played at Rodney Parade until the 1990s.

Former facilities

Newport City Skate Park 
The concrete Skate Park was opened in October 2008 at a construction cost of over £200,000. It was designed in consultation with local skate boarders and Newport Youth Council to meet the needs of both beginners and experienced skate boarders. In 2012 it was closed and relocated to Tredegar Park on the west side of the city in preparation for the construction of the Football Development Centre.

See also 
Cardiff International Sports Village
Newport Centre (Wales)

References

External links 
 Newport International Sports Village official site

Indoor arenas in Newport, Wales
Swimming venues in Newport, Wales
Sports venues in Newport, Wales
Landmarks in Newport, Wales
Tourist attractions in Newport, Wales
Cricket grounds in Wales
Glamorgan County Cricket Club